George "Babe" Tuffanelli (born Constant Tuffanelli) (1903-1975) was a powerful mobster who ran Chicago's southside for Al Capone.

Immigration
Tuffanelli was born in Italy and came to America with his brother Luigi Tuffanelli around 1900. Luigi got sick on the voyage; therefore, he was not permitted to enter the U.S. So both brothers jumped ship and came into America as illegal immigrants, settling in New York City.

Crime involvement
Tuffanelli got more involved in the life of crime and became more invested in the Italian Mafia as time passed. He moved to the southside of Chicago, where he became a friend and associate of notorious gangsters such as Al Capone and Jimmy Derrico. Tuffanelli became a powerful member in the Chicago Outfit and ran the southside as boss of Blue Island.

After his rise to power and success, he started investing his money in racecars and then moved with the mob to Las Vegas, Nevada, to invest in the casinos.

References

External links
 AAA Championship History 1948 AutoSport Bulletin Board
 http://www.kalracing.com/Autoracing/chicago_whispers_may%2025%202009.htm

American gangsters
American gangsters of Italian descent
1903 births
1975 deaths
Italian emigrants to the United States